KXNA (104.9 FM) is a radio station broadcasting an alternative format. Licensed to Springdale, Arkansas, United States, it serves the Fayetteville (North West Arkansas) area. The station is currently owned by Elizabeth Marquis.

The station was a finalist for Radio and Records magazine's 2007 Industry Achievement Award for Best Alternative Station for markets 100 and up. Other finalists include WKZQ-FM, WJSE, WBTZ, KQXR, and WSFM.

History
The station debuted on September 19, 1968, as KCIZ-FM. It went through a slew of formats. Beginning with Top 40 for its first few years as "Stereo 105", MOR in the late 1970s, adult contemporary in 1983 as "FM 105", and back to Top 40/CHR for five years as "KC105" ("The Hot FM") from 1986 until 1991.

In April of 1991, the station dropped CHR altogether and flipped to an easy listening format as "EZ-105". It didn't last very long, and in August 1992, the station dropped its easy listening format for a country format and changed its call letters to KBEV as "Beaver 105". In October 1994, its call-letters were changed to KBRS. The station flipped its format to Alternative Rock in 1997, and its current KXNA call-letters was introduced in November 2000.

Effective June 1, 2019, KXNA was sold as part of the Rox Radio Group's acquisition of the Hog Radio Group properties including KFMD-FM. The new owner of KXNA is Elizabeth Marquis, who acquired the station's license on January 27, 2021.

References

External links

Modern rock radio stations in the United States
XNA
Springdale, Arkansas
Radio stations established in 1968
1968 establishments in Arkansas